Juan Carlos Alegría Villamán (born 22 January 1975) is a Chilean former professional footballer who played as a midfielder for clubs in Chile and Venezuela.

Club career
A product of Colo-Colo youth system, where he coincided with players such as Nicolás Córdova and Manuel Villalobos, he made his professional debut in a 1992 Copa Chile match against Magallanes, where he scored a goal at the minute 86, becoming the youngest player who has scored for the club at professional level.

In Chile he also played for Magallanes, in two stints, and Universidad de Concepción.

Abroad, he played for the Venezuelan clubs , Deportivo Maracaibo and Mineros de Guayana. For Deportivo Maracaibo, he scored 5 goals.

As a curiosity, in 2006 he coincided in Italmaracaibo with the Argentine player Sergio Daniel López, who is a nephew of Diego Maradona.

International career
Alegría represented Chile at under-17 level in the 1991 South American Championship and at under-20 level in the 1995 South American Championship.

Coaching career
He graduated as a football manager and worked as the assistant of both Hernán Caputto in Chile U15 and Hugo Tocalli in Chile U17.

He is a member of the technical department of Colo-Colo.

Personal life
He has a close friendship with the former footballer Frank Lobos.

Honours
Colo-Colo
 Chilean Primera División (4): 1993, 1996, 1997 Clausura, 1998
 Copa Chile (2): 1994, 1996

References

External links
 
 
 Juan Carlos Alegría at playmakerstats.com (English version of ceroacero.es)

1975 births
Living people
Footballers from Santiago
Chilean footballers
Chilean expatriate footballers
Chile youth international footballers
Chile under-20 international footballers
Deportes Magallanes footballers
Colo-Colo footballers
Universidad de Concepción footballers
Magallanes footballers
A.C.C.D. Mineros de Guayana players
Chilean Primera División players
Primera B de Chile players
Venezuelan Primera División players
Venezuelan Segunda División players
Chilean expatriate sportspeople in Venezuela
Expatriate footballers in Venezuela
Association football midfielders
Chilean football managers